The 1961 Montana Grizzlies football team represented the University of Montana in the 1961 NCAA University Division football season as a member of the Skyline Conference (Skyline). The Grizzlies were led by fourth-year head coach Ray Jenkins, played their home games at Dornblaser Field and finished the season with a record of two wins and six losses (2–6, 2–4 Skyline).

This was the last year for the conference; the new Western Athletic Conference (WAC) debuted the next season; Montana was an independent in 1962 and a charter member of the Big Sky Conference in 1963.

Schedule

References

Montana
Montana Grizzlies football seasons
Montana Grizzlies football